Italy has sent delegations to the Summer Paralympics since the first games in 1960, and to the Winter Paralympics since 1980.

The Paralympic Games are a multi-sport event for athletes with physical and sensorial disabilities. This includes athletes with mobility disabilities, amputations, blindness, and cerebral palsy. The Paralympic Games are held every four years, following the Olympic Games, and are governed by the International Paralympic Committee (IPC).

Medal Tables

Multiple medallists

These are official report of International Paralympic Committee.
 Athletes in bold are athletes who are still competing.
 Updated to Tokyo 2021.

See also 
 Italy at the Summer Paralympics
 Italy at the Winter Paralympics
 Italy at the Olympics

References

External links
Italian Paralympic Committee
International Paralympic Committee